Štitar is a village in Serbia, located around 9 km west from the town of Šabac, in Mačva District.

Geography
Štitar lies is in the heart of Mačva, an alluvial fertile flatland between the rivers Drina and Sava. The area of today's village was until the 18th century covered with dense and virtually impassable forest, Kitog.

History
By the end of 19th century, Štitar was populated by Serb refugees from outside of then-autonomous (and later independent) Serbia. The first group came from Montenegro in the 18th century, followed by others from Herzegovina, Bosnia, and parts of present-day Serbia that remained under Ottoman rule after the Second Serbian Uprising.

Demographics
According to 2002 census, the village has 2,285 inhabitants, mostly Serbs.

Famous inhabitants
 Branimir Ćosić (1903–1934), Serbian writer and journalist
 Miroslav Đukić (born 1966), Serbian footballer and coach
Olivera Marković (born 1992)
Petar Dinić (born 1993), Serbian Web developer

See also
List of places in Serbia
Mačva

Mačva
Populated places in Mačva District
Šabac